"Animal Rights" is an instrumental by Canadian electronic music producer Deadmau5 and American DJ Wolfgang Gartner. It was released on September 6, 2010, as the second single from Deadmau5's fifth studio album, 4×4=12.

Background
The single debuted on BBC Radio 1's coverage of Creamfields 2010 on 28 August 2010, at which Deadmau5 was playing. On 1 December 2010, the song was added to BBC Radio 1's playlist. Following this, the song entered the UK Singles Chart and peaked at number 70, and also reached number 10 in the UK Dance Chart.

Track listing

Charts

References 

2010 songs
2010 singles
Deadmau5 songs
House music songs
Virgin Records singles
Ultra Music singles
Songs written by Deadmau5
Wolfgang Gartner songs